"Dedicated To The One I Love" is a song written by Lowman Pauling and Ralph Bass that was a hit for the "5" Royales, the Shirelles, the Mamas & the Papas and Bitty McLean. Pauling was the guitarist of the "5" Royales, the group that recorded the original version of the song, produced by Bass, in 1957. Their version was re-released in 1961 and charted at number 81 on the Billboard Hot 100.

The Shirelles version
A cover version recorded by American girl group the Shirelles reached number 83 in 1959. This version was re-released in 1961 and reached number three on the Billboard Hot 100 chart and number two on Billboards Hot R&B Sides. The song was subsequently included on their 1961 album Tonight's the Night.

The Mamas & The Papas version

In 1967, a subsequent and slightly more popular cover version by the Mamas & the Papas released on the Dunhill label went to number 2 on the Billboard Hot 100, kept from number 1 by "Happy Together" by The Turtles.  This version also reached number 2 on the UK's Record Retailer chart.  The lead singer on the Mamas & the Papas version was Michelle Phillips. It was the first time that Phillips was given the lead over Cass Elliot. The song was also included on the group's 1967 album The Mamas & The Papas Deliver.

While the song mixes of the group's singles differ significantly from their album counterparts with some frequency ("Words of Love" and "Creeque Alley," in particular, feature overdubbed instruments that don't appear on the album versions of the songs), "Dedicated To The One I Love" used the same mix for both single and album.  However, there are differing versions of the song available. 
The mono single and mono album versions are identical.  In them, Michelle's voice is double-tracked, but mixed down into the 'sound' of one voice.  Cass's vocals are more prominent on these, as is the piano accompaniment.  The cold ending features all four group members in signature harmony.
The stereo album mix moves the piano to the back of the mix, and Mama Cass' voice is further blended into the others'. This is particularly prevalent at the end of the song, where Cass is all but absent. 

Cash Box called the single a "groovey, harmonic, soft rock venture that is sure to please all of the group’s many fans."

The group appeared on The Ed Sullivan Show in 1967 to perform both this song and the single to follow, "Creeque Alley".  Although the single has a running time of 2:56, and the group performed the song in its entirety, edited versions of the song appear on internet video sites with a much shorter running time.

Personnel
According to the AFM contract sheet, the following musicians played on the track.

John Phillips - session leader; guitar
Hal Blaine - contractor; drums
Gary Coleman - percussion
Bones Howe
Larry Knechtel - keyboards
Joe Osborn - bass guitar
Denny Doherty
Tommy Tedesco - guitars

Charts

Other versions
1965: Johnny Preston released a version of the song as the B-side of his single "Running Bear '65".
1965: Reparata and the Delrons covered the song on their LP Whenever a Teenager Cries.
1967: The Lettermen released a version of the song on their album Spring!
1968: The O'Kaysions released a version of the song on their debut album, Girl Watcher and as the B-side of their single, "Love Machine".
1972: The Temprees' version reached number 17 on Billboards Soul Singles chart and number 93 on the Billboard Hot 100.
1973: Ruben and the Jets released it on their album For Real!1981: Bernadette Peters recorded a version, which reached number 65 on the Billboard Hot 100.
1994: Bitty McLean recorded a reggae remake, which reached number 6 on the UK Singles Chart.
1996: Linda Ronstadt made it the title song of her album Dedicated to the One I Love. 
1998: Tanya Stephens included the song on her album Ruff Rider.
2000: Holly Cole included the song on her album Romantically Helpless.
2001: Rosie & the Originals recorded an a cappella version for their album Angel Baby Revisited.
2007: Renée Geyer recorded a version on her album Dedicated.
2013: Wilson Phillips included it on their album Dedicated.

The song in popular culture
 In the 1980s, a version of the song was used in a Kellogg's Special K commercial.
 In an episode of the television show China Beach, the actress Chloe Webb, portraying a USO touring backup singer, offers a tender and emotional version of the song to a fatally injured soldier as a last request as he is dying.
 In DTV, in 1984, the Mamas & the Papas' version of the song was set to Sleeping Beauty.
 The song was used in a scene in the 1986 film House.
 In 1992, the long-running CBS nighttime soap opera Knots Landing, in which Michelle Phillips starred, named an episode "Dedicated to the One I Love", in which the Mamas & the Papas' version of the song is played in the background. 
 The Shirelles version is used in Homicide: Life on the Street (season 5) , episode 17 episode titled "Kaddish".
 The song was used in the last scene and fade-out of the 2002 movie Morvern Callar.
 In 2005, the song was covered by the final 10 of the second season of New Zealand Idol.
 The Mamas & the Papas' version is played at the end of the last scene and during the credits of the 2014 movie The One I Love.   
 In 2017, the Netflix series trailer for their movie Okja is set to a re-edited version of the Mamas and the Papas' version.
 The song was used in a scene in the 2018 film Mid90s''.
 The Mamas and Papas' version of the song runs over the closing credits to episode 5 of season 3 of the streaming television series The Marvelous Mrs. Maisel, which centers on the fictional friendship between Miriam Maisel and Lenny Bruce.
 The Mamas and Papas' version of the song is played in Schitt's Creek during the last scene of Season 6, Episode 8.
 The Temprees’ version runs over the closing credits of  Atlanta Season 3, Episode 5.

References

1957 songs
1957 singles
1959 singles
1961 singles
1967 singles
1972 singles
1981 singles
1994 singles
Songs written by Lowman Pauling
Songs written by Ralph Bass
The "5" Royales songs
The Shirelles songs
The Mamas and the Papas songs
Johnny Preston songs
The Lettermen songs
The O'Kaysions songs
Linda Ronstadt songs
Wilson Phillips songs
Bitty McLean songs
Scepter Records singles
Dunhill Records singles
MCA Records singles
Song recordings produced by Lou Adler